Parimal Ghosh (15 March 1917 – 14 October 1985) was an Indian politician and diplomat. He was elected to the Lok Sabha, lower house of the Parliament of India from Ghatal in 1967.He was the Minister for State for Railways Under Indira Gandhi from 1967 to 1969. He was elected to the West Bengal legislative assembly from Beldanga constituency in 1957 . He served as Ambassador to Turkey from 1981 to 1984.

References

External links
 Profile on Lok Sabha Profile

1917 births
1985 deaths
West Bengal MLAs 1957–1962
India MPs 1967–1970
Lok Sabha members from West Bengal
Ambassadors of India
Ambassadors of India to Turkey